Büyük Kolej is a defunct basketball club based in Ankara, Turkey that played in the Turkish Basketball League. Their home arena was Ankara Atatürk Sport Hall.

Notable players

 Adem Ören (2001–2004) 
 Caner Topaloğlu (2005–2006)
 Murat Kaya (2000–2006)
/ Mirko Milićević (2000–2001)&(2004-2005)
 K'zell Wesson (2000–2001)
 Lavelle Felton (2003–2005)
 Ricardo Marsh (2003–2004)

References

External links 
 Büyük Kolej team page on Eurobasket.com 
 TBLStat.net Profile 

Turkish Basketball Super League teams
Defunct basketball teams in Turkey
Basketball teams established in 1987
Basketball teams disestablished in 2006